Sharla Boehm, née Perrine, (born 1929, Seattle) is an American computer scientist who carried out pioneering work in packet switching while working for the RAND Corporation in the 1960s.

Biography
Born in Seattle in 1929, Sharla Perrine moved to Santa Monica three years later. After graduating in mathematics from the University of California, Los Angeles, she taught mathematics and science in Santa Monica schools. She began to work at RAND in 1959 where she met her husband to be, Barry Boehm.

In 1964, together with her colleague Paul Baran, she published a paper titled "On Distributed Communications: II. Digital Simulation of Hot-Potato Routing in a Broadband Distributed Communications Network". As her name appears first in the original paper, she seems to have been the one who was behind the simulation programmed in Fortran, showing that packet switching (or "hot-potato routing" as it was called) could indeed work.

In RAND and the Information Evolution, Baran describes how Boehm carried out various simulations under different conditions, demonstrating that the protocol routed traffic efficiently. In particular, it was discovered that if half the network was destroyed, the remainder reorganized and began routing again in less than a second.

In a 1996 paper on "An Early Application Generator and Other Recollections", Barry Boehm notes that Sharla Boehm "had developed the original packet-switched network simulation with Paul Baran", a development which led him to become involved in the pioneering ARPAnet Working Group.

References

1929 births
Living people
American computer scientists
American women computer scientists
RAND Corporation people
20th-century American scientists
20th-century American women scientists
21st-century American scientists
21st-century American women scientists